Morgan County is a county located in the U.S. state of Kentucky. As of the 2020 census, the population was 13,726. Its county seat is West Liberty. The county is among the dry counties, which means that the sale of alcohol is restricted or prohibited.

History
Morgan County was formed on December 7, 1822, from portions of Bath County and Floyd County. It was named for Daniel Morgan, a distinguished general in the American Revolutionary War.

During the Civil War, Morgan County was almost solidly pro-confederate, donating dozens of men to the 5th KY Infantry (CSA). 

Morgan County was hit by an EF3 tornado on March 2, 2012, which cost the lives of six people and injured many others. Following the tornado, Morgan County's population decreased, but the county seat still has a strong population for a small town.

Morgan County had begun building a new court house in 2011, but the tornado delayed its construction to late 2013.

Geography

Adjacent counties
 Rowan County (northwest)
 Elliott County (north)
 Lawrence County (northeast)
 Johnson County (east)
 Magoffin County (southeast)
 Wolfe County (southwest)
 Menifee County (west)

National protected area
 Daniel Boone National Forest (part)

Demographics

As of the census of 2000, there were 13,948 people, 4,752 households, and 3,568 families residing in the county. The racial makeup of the county was 94.59% White, 4.38% Black or African American, 0.15% Native American, 0.16% Asian, 0.01% Pacific Islander, 0.06% from other races, and 0.65% from two or more races. 0.61% of the population were Hispanic or Latino of any race.

There were 4,752 households, out of which 34.80% had children under the age of 18 living with them, 62.40% were married couples living together, 9.20% had a female householder with no husband present, and 24.90% were non-families. 22.60% of all households were made up of individuals, and 10.30% had someone living alone who was 65 years of age or older. The average household size was 2.55 and the average family size was 2.97.

In the county, the population was spread out, with 22.40% under the age of 18, 10.60% from 18 to 24, 32.90% from 25 to 44, 22.30% from 45 to 64, and 11.80% who were 65 years of age or older. The median age was 36 years. For every 100 females there were 123.30 males. For every 100 females age 18 and over, there were 128.40 males.

The median income for a household in the county was $21,869, and the median income for a family was $26,135. Males had a median income of $23,966 versus $18,463 for females. The per capita income for the county was $12,657. 27.20% of the population and 23.50% of families were below the poverty line. Out of the total people living in poverty, 33.90% are under the age of 18 and 28.50% are 65 or older.

Politics
Morgan County was a strongly Democratic county throughout the 20th century, with the party's candidate winning in every presidential election from 1912 until 2000, when Al Gore became the first Democrat to lose the county since Woodrow Wilson in 1912. In the 21st century, however, like almost all of Kentucky, the county has flipped to the Republicans in US Presidential elections.

Communities

City
 West Liberty (county seat)

Census-designated place
 Ezel

Other unincorporated places

 Caney
 Cannel City
 Cottle
 Crockett
 Dingus
 Elamton
 Elkfork
 Grassy Creek
 Lenox
 Malone
 Mima
 Mize
 Moon
 Ophir
 Relief
 Stacy Fork
 White Oak
 Wrigley
 Yocum
 Zag

See also
 National Register of Historic Places listings in Morgan County, Kentucky

References

External links
 County Background and History
 Morgan County Schools
 The Kentucky Highlands Project
 Morgan History & Ancestry

 
Kentucky counties
Counties of Appalachia
1822 establishments in Kentucky
Populated places established in 1822